Popasna is a city in Sievierodonetsk Raion, Luhansk Oblast, Ukraine. In 2013, it had almost 22,000 inhabitants. Prior to 2020, it was the administrative center of Popasna Raion before it was abolished.

During the 2022 Russian invasion of Ukraine, the city was largely destroyed as a result of fighting between Ukrainian and Russian forces. Since May 2022, Russia has occupied the city and later declared its annexation of the region in September.

History 

During World War II, in 1941–1943, the German occupiers operated a Nazi prison in the town. A local newspaper began published in the city in March 1979.

2014-2022
On 19 June 2014, Ukrainian forces reportedly secured Popasna from pro-Russian separatists. On 8 July 2014, separatist militants retook control of the town. On 22 July 2014, the Ukrainian Donbas Battalion took back the town from the separatists, who abandoned the town that day.

Afterwards, the city came under periodic artillery shelling and rocket attacks as well as occasional ground assaults from the separatists for years.
Land mines have been also laid near Popasna. By March 2015, the city only had two stores with some basic products and one pharmacy and residents received food distribution through a volunteer organization. Residents also complained about having to pay for public utilities and for having been cut off from social benefits supplied by the Ukrainian government.

2022 Russian invasion of Ukraine 

In early March 2022, during the Russian invasion of Ukraine, Popasna was attacked by Russian forces. During the Battle of Donbas (2022), the city has been at the frontlines of fighting between Russia and Ukraine. In the fighting near Popasna, Russian forces reportedly damaged or destroyed every property in the town center. Governor of Luhansk Oblast, Serhiy Haidai, claimed that Russian forces were "removing [Popasna] from the map of Luhansk region".

On 7 May 2022, Haidai confirmed that Ukrainian troops were forced to retreat from the city of Popasna to take up more fortified positions, adding "everything was destroyed there". Ukrainian forces announced that they had withdrawn from Popasna, allowing Russia to fully occupy the town. Russia's Chechen leader Ramzan Kadyrov stated that his troops now control most of the city. Photographic evidence supplied by the governor of Luhansk Oblast has revealed that Russian forces had beheaded and dismembered a Ukrainian soldier and displayed his body parts stuck on poles in the captured city. On August 15, 2022, it was reported that Ukrainian forces hit the regional headquarters of the Wagner Group after a pro-Kremlin reporter revealed its location at Mironovskaya 12 in a photo.

Two months after the Battle of Popasna, a Reuters reporter toured the town in July and reported that the town looked entirely deserted by both humans and animals, with nearly all of its buildings either destroyed or heavily damaged. The leader of the Russian Luhansk People's Republic stated there is no point in rebuilding the city destroyed during the Russian assault.

In December 2022 Russian forces were reported to have constructed multiple lines of defence to the West of Popasna to blunt any Ukrainian attacks.  These defences included "Dragon's teeth", trenches, and pillboxes.

References

External links

Bakhmutsky Uyezd
Cities in Luhansk Oblast
Destroyed cities
Populated places established in the Russian Empire
Sievierodonetsk Raion
Yekaterinoslav Governorate